Proof of Youth is the second studio album by English band The Go! Team. It was released on 10 September 2007 in the United Kingdom by Memphis Industries and a day later in the United States by Sub Pop. Proof of Youth was preceded by two singles: "Grip Like a Vice", released on 2 July 2007, and "Doing It Right", released on 3 September 2007.

The first pressing of the album on Compact Disc includes a second disc, with six additional tracks in the UK or four in the US.

Composition
Proof of Youth encompasses various genres of music, including indie rock, hip-hop and dance. The album features vocal contributions from Bonde do Rolê's Marina Ribatski, Solex, the Double Dutch Divas, the Rappers Delight Club, and Public Enemy's Chuck D.

Track listing

Sample credits
 "Grip Like a Vice" contains samples of "Psycha-Soula-Funkadelic", written by Charles Hearndon, McKinley Jackson, Melvin Griffin, and Ruth Copeland, and performed by The Politicians featuring McKinley Jackson; "Cosmic Blast", written by Ronald Greene, Taharqa Aleem, and Tunde Aleem, and performed by Captain Rock; and Beat This: A Hip-Hop History.
 "Doing It Right" contains samples of "I'll Always Love You", written by Weldon McDougal and performed by Cindy Gibson; and "International Girl", written by Guy Hemric and Jerry Styner.
 "My World" is a version of "The Free Life" by Alan Parker.
 "Titanic Vandalism" contains samples of "Psycha-Soula-Funkadelic", written by Charles Hearndon, McKinley Jackson, Melvin Griffin, and Ruth Copeland, and performed by The Politicians featuring McKinley Jackson.
 "Keys to the City" contains samples of "Out of Your Mind", written by Bill Leeder; "99 Donne, Seq. 3", written and performed by Bruno Nicolai; and I Was Made to Love Her.
 "The Wrath of Marcie" contains samples of "Turn It Around in Your Mind", written by Jerry Reed Hubbard and performed by Glen Campbell.
 "I Never Needed It Now So Much" contains samples of "Early in the Morning", written and performed by Peter Gosling and Peter Scott.
 "Flashlight Fight" contains samples of "Blacula Strikes!", written and performed by Gene Page.
 "Patricia's Moving Picture" contains samples of "Mulher Rendeira", written and performed by Alfredo Ricardo do Nascimento.

Personnel
Credits for Proof of Youth adapted from album liner notes.

The Go! Team
 Jamie Bell – bass, glockenspiel, feedback
 Sam Dook – guitar, drums, banjo
 Ninja – vocals
 Ian Parton – guitar, harmonica, drums, piano
 Chi Fukami Taylor – drums, vocals
 Kaori Tsuchida – guitar, vocals, glockenspiel, keyboards

Additional musicians
 Joe Auckland
 Chuck D – performance on "Flashlight Fight"
 DJ Manipulate
 The Double Dutch Divas – performance on "Universal Speech" and "Keys to the City"
 Bob Dowell
 Elisabeth Esselink – performance on "Fake ID"
 Fierce Allstars
 Gary Kavanagh
 Myriam Megharbi
 Robin Pridy
 Rappers Delight Club – performance on "Universal Speech"
 Ben Somers
 Marina Vello – performance on "Titanic Vandalism" and "Universal Speech"

Production
 The Go! Team – production
 Gareth Parton – production
 Streaky – mastering
Artwork and design
 Sam Egarr – additional design
 Kate Ferrier – artwork

Charts

References

External links
 
 

2007 albums
The Go! Team albums